Levi Jefferson Ham (November 16, 1805 – June 11, 1887) was an American politician and surgeon.

Ham was born in Shapleigh, Maine, on November 16, 1805, to a family of Scottish descent. Ham graduated from Dartmouth College in 1828, and received his medical degree from Bowdoin College in 1831. He worked as a doctor in York County, Maine from 1831 until 1845 and then in Erie County, New York from 1846 until 1859, when he relocated to South Bend. Ham maintained a medical practice until 1871.

Ham won election to the Maine Senate in September 1835 and served between 1837 and 1838. During Ham's term in the state senate, he served as senate president and was involved in establishing an insane asylum in Maine. He also served on its board. Ham had a role in negotiating the border dispute with Britain. He eventually moved to New York and then South Bend. During the American Civil War, Ham was attached to the 48th Indiana Infantry Regiment. He had extensive service as a surgeon overseeing hospitals and care at various military posts. He was a reluctant mayor of South Bend who served from 1880 to 1884. As mayor of South Bend, he was a member of the Democratic Party.

Ham had a son and a daughter. His son M. M. Ham ran the Dubuque Herald and served on the Iowa Senate. Levi J. Ham died on June 11, 1887.

References

1805 births
1887 deaths
Indiana Democrats
Mayors of South Bend, Indiana
Democratic Party Maine state senators
19th-century American physicians
Dartmouth College alumni
Bowdoin College alumni
Physicians from Maine
Physicians from Indiana
Physicians from New York (state)
Union Army surgeons
American people of Scottish descent
People from York County, Maine
19th-century American politicians